Seymour Schulich, OC (born January 6, 1940) is a Canadian businessman, investor, author, and philanthropist.

Biography
Schulich was raised in a Jewish family in Montreal, Quebec. He graduated from McGill University with a BSc in 1961 and an MBA from the Desautels Faculty of Management in 1965. He earned the Chartered Financial Analyst designation from the University of Virginia in 1969.

He is married to Tanna and they live in Willowdale, a neighbourhood of Toronto. They have two daughters and four grandchildren.

Career
His first job was at Shell Oil Company. From 1968 to 1990, he worked at Beutel, Goodman & Company Ltd., a pension fund management company which manages in excess of $10.6 billion CAD (as of 2003), becoming president and vice-chairman.

In 1978, Schulich, along with partner Pierre Lassonde, helped pioneer the concept of royalty payments in the mining industry: their Franco-Nevada and Euro-Nevada companies discovered some precious minerals, but their royalty arrangements allowed them to gain ownership stakes in some of the world’s most profitable mines. A $1,000 investment in Franco-Nevada's stock in 1983 was worth $1.2 million in 2002, equivalent to a 40% average annual rate of return. In 2002, Franco-Nevada merged with Normandy Mining Limited of Australia and Newmont Mining Corporation, creating the largest gold mining company in the world, Newmont Mining Corporation. Schulich was Director of Newmont Mining and Chairman of its merchant banking division from 2002-2007.

In 2007, Schulich published a book titled Get Smarter: Life and Business Lessons.

Philanthropy
Schulich has donated funds to numerous Canadian universities including York (Schulich School of Business), Western Ontario (Schulich School of Medicine & Dentistry), Calgary (Schulich School of Engineering), Dalhousie (Schulich School of Law, Dalhousie Faculty of Computer Science), McGill (Schulich School of Music), Nipissing (Schulich School of Education), and Queen's (Schulich-Woolf Rare Book Collection). The first and largest donation that was made was to the Schulich School of Business at York University.  All degrees issued by the Schulich School of Business now bear the signature of Seymour Schulich.  His philanthropy also extends beyond universities, to the Sunnybrook Health Sciences Centre (Schulich Heart Centre) in Toronto, and outside Canada to the University of Nevada, Reno (Schulich Lecture Hall) and Technion – Israel Institute of Technology.

On October 15, 2009, Schulich officially presented a donation in the amount of $20 million to Dalhousie University's Law School; in doing so, the Law School has now been renamed the Schulich School of Law.

On October 14, 2011, Schulich announced a $100 million scholarship program targeting students entering the science, technology, engineering and math fields (STEM) in Canada and Israel.  This gift is being co-administered by UJA Federation of Greater Toronto and the Schulich Foundation. The program is called Schulich Leader Scholarships, the largest undergraduate STEM scholarship opportunity in each country.

Honours
 2013, Doctor of Laws, honoris causa, Dalhousie University
 2011, Officer of the Order of Canada "for his transformational philanthropy in support of our education and health care institutions".
2011, Inductee, Canadian Business Hall of Fame
 2010, Doctor of Laws, honoris causa, University of Calgary
 2008, Doctor of Laws, honoris causa, University of Western Ontario
 2006, Inductee, Canadian Mining Hall of Fame
 2004, Honorary Doctorate, McGill University
 2003, Doctor of Laws, honoris causa, York University
 1999, Member of the Order of Canada
 1998, "Developer of the Year" by the Prospectors and Developers Association of Canada
 1997, with Pierre Lassonde, named "Mining Man of the Year" by The Northern Miner

Partial bibliography

 Schulich, Seymour. Get Smarter Life and Business Lessons. Toronto: Key Porter Books, 2007. 
 Schulich, Seymour. Weather Gas Distribution Companies and Stock Markets ( a Theory for Short Term Traders.) --. S.l: s.n.], 1965.

See also
 Schulich School of Law
 Schulich School of Music
 Schulich School of Business
 Schulich School of Medicine & Dentistry
 Schulich School of Engineering

References

Sources
 McGill University news
 The Schulich donation and the naming of the Schulich School of Medicine – Issues
 Seymour Schulich's biography – an Indigo Author

Further reading

 Gray, John. 2006. "LIVE & LEARN – Seymour Schulich – The Entrepreneur, Mentor and Philanthropist on His First Investment and Favourite Painter". Canadian Business. 79, no. 24: 144.

1940 births
Living people
Anglophone Quebec people
Businesspeople from Montreal
Canadian mining businesspeople
Canadian business writers
Canadian investors
Jewish Canadian philanthropists
Jewish Canadian writers
McGill University Faculty of Management alumni
Officers of the Order of Canada
University of Virginia alumni
Writers from Montreal
CFA charterholders
Canadian billionaires